Proctor's Theater or Proctor Theatre or variations may refer to:

Proctor's Theatre (Schenectady, New York), listed on the NRHP as F. F. Proctor Theatre and Arcade in Schenectady, New York
Proctor's Theater (Troy, New York), listed on the National Register of Historic Places in Rensselaer County, New York
Proctor's Theater (Yonkers, New York), listed on the National Register of Historic Places in Westchester County, New York

See also
Proctor House (disambiguation)